Rebecka Sheffield is an archivist, scholar, and policy advisor. She is a Senior Policy Advisor of the Archives of Ontario and teaches information science in American and Canadian universities.

Biography
Rebecka Sheffield is a previous director of the ArQuives: Canada's LGBTQ2+ Archives and vice-president of the Association of Canadian Archivists (ACA). She has a bachelor's degree in Women and Gender Studies from the University of Saskatchewan, a Master's Degree in archival studies from the University of Toronto and a PhD from the University of Toronto in collaboration with the Mark S. Bonham Center for Sexual Diversity Studies.

Sheffield is a scholar in archival science. She is the author of Documenting Rebellions: A Study of Four Lesbian and Gay Archives in Queer Times, which discusses the relationship between archives and social movements within the LGBTQ2+ community. She has also worked as a public advocate about the preservation of queer cultural history in Toronto.

Intellectual contribution
Rebecka Sheffield's archival contributions focuses on community archives, and historical and cultural heritage movements in LGBTQ2+ communities.

Sheffield is the lead of an archival and artistic project The Bedside Table Archives, which documents objects found on the bedside tables of lesbian and queer women. The project focuses on the home as a space for identity construction while questioning the heteronormativity of such spaces.

She has also published Documenting rebellions: A Study of Four Lesbian and Gay Archives in Queer Times, which focuses on four institutions that preserve the records of queer folk.

Publications
 Documenting rebellions : A study of four lesbian and gay archives in queer times. Litwin Books, 2020.
 "Archival Optimism, or, How to Sustain a Community Archives." Community Archives, Community Spaces: Heritage, Memory and Identity. Facet Publishing, 2020.
 "Community Archives." Currents of Archival Thinking, 2nd Edition. 2017.: 351–376.
 "Take Me Away to Another World ." Any Other Way: How Toronto Got Queer. Toronto: CoachHouse Press, 2017.
"Privacy, Context & Pride: The Management of Digital Photographs in a Queer Archives." Queers Online: LGBT Digital Practices in Libraries, Archives, and Museums. Litwin Books, 2015.
 "The Bedside Table Archives: Archive Intervention and Lesbian Intimate Domestic Culture." Radical History Review, n°120 (2014): 108–120.

References

External links
 Interview with Dr. Rebecka Sheffield (2020)
Panel Discussion on Diverse Histories in Toronto featuring Dr. Rebecka Sheffield (2019)

1976 births
Living people
Canadian archivists
University of Toronto alumni
University of Saskatchewan alumni
LGBT archivists